Rahim Abdullah (born 12 September 1947) is a Malaysian footballer. 

A police officer, Rahim has played for Penang FA, Perak FA and Selangor FA during his football career.
He also played for Malaysia national team, and competed in the men's tournament at the 1972 Summer Olympics. He has also coached for various teams, including as head coach of Malaysia national football team in 1991.

In 2004, he was inducted in Olympic Council of Malaysia's Hall of Fame for 1972 Summer Olympics football team.

Honour
Perak
 Malaysia Cup: 1970

Selangor
 Malaysia Cup: 1971, 1972, 1973, 1975

Malaysia
 Merdeka Cup: 1973

References

1947 births
Living people
Malaysian footballers
Malaysia international footballers
Olympic footballers of Malaysia
Footballers at the 1972 Summer Olympics
Penang F.C. players
Perak F.C. players
Selangor FA players
Place of birth missing (living people)
Association football midfielders
Competitors at the 1973 Southeast Asian Peninsular Games
Southeast Asian Games bronze medalists for Malaysia
Southeast Asian Games medalists in football
Malaysia national football team managers
Malaysian football managers
20th-century Malaysian people